Issel's groove-toothed swamp rat (Pelomys isseli) is a species of rodent in the family Muridae.
It is found only in Uganda.
Its natural habitats are arable land and rural gardens.
It is threatened by habitat loss.

References

Sources

Pelomys
Mammals described in 1924
Taxonomy articles created by Polbot